Ian Forrest (born 22 February 1950 in Kirkliston, Scotland) is a British auto racing driver.

He first started racing in 1971, and went on to win 26 national saloon and sports car titles in his native Scotland. In 1989 he first entered the British Touring Car Championship. Forrest competed in four consecutive seasons in the BTCC, each time with a privately entered BMW M3, prepared by Prodrive. His 1991 effort saw him win the Privateer award and the £10,000 prize.

He is currently the Circuit Manager at Knockhill Racing Circuit in Scotland.

He is a qualified Clerk Of The Course for motorcycle racing.

He was awarded the Jackie Stewart Medal in 2006 and The Jim Clark Trophy in 2010 for lifetime services to Scottish Motorsports.

His son, Sandy, also races and has competed in the BRSCC Ford Fiesta Championship.

Ian has also been seen regularly on Mark Evans' TV "Is Born" Series for Discovery Channel; "A Car Is Born,", "A Car Is Reborn" and "A Racing Car Is Born"

Racing record

Complete British Touring Car Championship results
(key) (Races in bold indicate pole position) (Races in italics indicate fastest lap)

References

External links
 Profile at BTCC Pages

1950 births
Scottish racing drivers
British Touring Car Championship drivers
Living people